Pitou Township is a rural township in Changhua County, Taiwan. One of the attractions in Pitou is the Kopok Flower Boulevard.

Administrative divisions
The township comprises 17 villages: Beitou, Dahu, Fuzhao, Gexing, Heli, Lilun, Liujia, Lunjiao, Lunzi, Pingyuan, Xingnong, Xinzhuang, Yongli, Yuanpu, Zhonghe, Zhuangnei and Zhuwei.

Education
 MingDao University

Tourist attractions
Nanyun Temple in Pitou is one of the stops on the annual Dajia Matsu pilgrimage.

Transportation
Pitou is adjacent to National Highway No. 1, with Zhangshui Road another major arterial route through the township. Pitou's location around major highways plays an important role in facilitating transportation of the township's agricultural produce.

References

External links
 Pitou Government website 

Townships in Changhua County